Rita Gunther McGrath (born July 28, 1959 in New Haven, Connecticut) is an American strategic management scholar and professor of management at the Columbia Business School. She is known for her work on strategy, innovation, and entrepreneurship, including the development of discovery-driven planning. 

McGrath is also the founder of the innovation platform Valize.

Life and work 
McGrath graduated magna cum laude from Barnard College in 1981 and earned a Masters of Public Administration from the School of International and Public Affairs, Columbia University in 1982. In 1993, she completed her Ph.D. at The Wharton School (University of Pennsylvania) with the dissertation, entitled Developing New Competence in Established Organizations consistent with her longstanding interest in corporate ventures and innovation.

McGrath started her career working in government and the political arena and founded two entrepreneurial startups. After her graduation in 1993, she joined Columbia as assistant professor of management, was promoted to associate professor of management in 1998, and recently became a full professor in the Faculty of Executive Education. In 2014, she was elected Deputy Dean of the Strategic Management Society Fellows

In 1999, McGrath received the "Best Paper" Academy Of Management Review, in 2001 the Maurice Holland "best paper" award from the Industrial Research Institute, and later the McKinsey 'best paper' award from the Strategic Management Society for McGrath and Nerkar, Real options reasoning and a new look at the R&D strategy of pharmaceutical firms.

In 2009, she was elected fellow of the Strategic Management Society, and in 2013 of the International Academy of Management. In 2013 she also received the Thinkers50 Distinguished Achievement Award in Strategy. She was named one of the top 20 thinkers in 2011, and one of the top 10 thinkers in 2013 by Thinkers50.

In 2019, McGrath was ranked the #5 most influential management thinker in the world by Thinkers50.

McGrath is the bestselling author of five books and is one of the most widely published authors in the Harvard Business Review, including “Discovery Driven Planning” (1995), which was recognized as an early articulation of today’s “lean” startup philosophy and has been cited by Clayton Christensen as “one of the most important ideas in management—ever.” She is the founder of the consulting firm Valize and maintains the weekly newsletter Thought Sparks on LinkedIn.

Honors and awards 

 2022 C. K. Prahalad award for scholarly impact on practice from the Strategic Management Society
 2022 Inducted into the Business Excellence Hall of Fame by the Business Excellence Institute
 2021 ranked the #2 management thinker in the world by Thinkers50 
 In 2019, she was ranked the #5 most influential leadership thinker in the world by Thinkers50
 2016 Theory to Practice award from the Vienna Strategy Forum
 2013 Distinguished Achievement Award in Strategy from Thinkers50
 In both 2011 and 2013, she was named one of the top 20 thinkers by Thinkers 50, one of the world's most prestigious rankings of management thinkers

Selected publications

Books 
 McGrath, Rita Gunther, and Ian C. MacMillan. The entrepreneurial mindset: Strategies for continuously creating opportunity in an age of uncertainty. Vol. 284. Harvard Business School Press, 2000.
 McGrath, Rita Gunther, and Ian C. MacMillan. MarketBusters: 40 Strategic moves that drive exceptional business growth. Harvard Business School Press, 2005.
 McGrath, Rita Gunther, and Ian C. MacMillan. Discovery Driven Growth: A breakthrough process to reduce risk and seize opportunity. Harvard Business Review Press, 2009.
 McGrath, Rita Gunther The End of Competitive Advantage. How to keep your strategy moving as fast as your  business. Harvard Business Review Press, 2013.
McGrath, Rita Gunther. Seeing Around Corners. How to spot inflection points in business before they happen. Houghton Mifflin Harcourt, 2019.

Notable articles 
 McGrath, Rita Gunther, and Ian C. MacMillan. “Discovery-driven planning.” Harvard Business Review (1995)
McGrath, Rita Gunther, Ian C. MacMillan, and Sankaran Venkataraman. "Defining and developing competence: a strategic process paradigm." Strategic Management Journal 16.4 (1995): 251-275.
 McGrath, Rita Gunther. "A real options logic for initiating technology positioning investments." Academy of Management Review 22.4 (1997): 974-996.
McGrath, Rita Gunther, and Ian C. MacMillan. “Discovering new points of differentiation.” Harvard Business Review (1997)
 McGrath, Rita Gunther. "Falling forward: Real options reasoning and entrepreneurial failure." Academy of Management review 24.1 (1999): 13-30.
 McGrath, Rita Gunther. "Exploratory learning, innovative capacity, and managerial oversight." Academy of Management Journal 44.1 (2001): 118-131.
McGrath, Rita Gunther, and Ian C. MacMillan. “MarketBusting: strategies for exceptional business growth.” Harvard Business Review (2005)
McGrath, Rita Gunther, and Ian C. MacMillan. “How to get unstuck.” Harvard Business Review (2009)
McGrath, Rita Gunther. “Failing by design.” Harvard Business Review (2011)
McGrath, Rita Gunther. “Transient advantage.” Harvard Business Review (2013)
McGrath, Rita Gunther, and Ryan McManus. “Discovery-Driven Digital Transformation.” Harvard Business Review (2020)

References

External links 
 
 Columbia directory page

Columbia University faculty
American business writers
Women business writers
Living people
Barnard College alumni
1959 births
School of International and Public Affairs, Columbia University alumni
American business theorists